Goran Nikolovski is the current Director of Administration for Security and Counterintelligence of Macedonia.

References

Living people
1967 births